MMLP can refer to any of the following:

 The Marshall Mathers LP, rapper Eminem's third studio album.
 The Marshall Mathers LP 2, a continuation of the above work and Eminem's eighth album.
 The ICAO airport code for Manuel Márquez de León International Airport in La Paz, Baja California Sur.
 Martin Midstream Partners L.P. a publicly traded master limited partnership.  MMLP trades on the NASDAQ exchange.
 Marion Maréchal-Le Pen